Roberto Ferrari (2 August 1923 – 11 October 1996) was an Italian fencer. He competed at the 1952, 1956 and 1960 Olympics and won a silver in 1952 and a bronze in 1960 in the team sabre event.

References

1923 births
1996 deaths
Italian male fencers
Olympic fencers of Italy
Fencers at the 1952 Summer Olympics
Fencers at the 1956 Summer Olympics
Fencers at the 1960 Summer Olympics
Olympic silver medalists for Italy
Olympic bronze medalists for Italy
Fencers from Rome
Olympic medalists in fencing
Medalists at the 1952 Summer Olympics
Medalists at the 1960 Summer Olympics
Mediterranean Games bronze medalists for Italy
Mediterranean Games medalists in fencing
Fencers at the 1951 Mediterranean Games
20th-century Italian people